Clube de Futebol União de Lamas (abbreviated as CF União de Lamas) is a Portuguese football club based in Santa Maria de Lamas, Santa Maria da Feira.

Background
CF União de Lamas currently plays in the AF Aveiro Campeonato Sabseg. The club was founded in 1932 and they play their home matches at the Comendador Henrique Amorim in Santa Maria de Lamas.

União de Lamas has won three Terceira Divisão titles and two Aveiro District titles. The club's most successful spell came in the mid-1990s, from 1995 to 2003, when they played in the Liga de Honra, Portugal's second-tier league. Their best classification overall was a 4th place in the Second Division North Zone in 1980, which at that time was the second-tier league in Portugal. Since the 2009–10 season the club has been competing in I Divisao of the AF Aveiro regional league.

The club is affiliated to Associação de Futebol de Aveiro and has competed in the AF Aveiro Cup. The club has also entered the national cup competition known as Taça de Portugal on many occasions.

Appearances
Tier 2: 9

Season to season

Honours

 Terceira Divisão: 3
1963–64, 1968–69, 2005–06

AF Aveiro Championship: 2
1941–42, 1942–43
AF Aveiro First Division: 2
1953–54, 1962–63

Notable former managers
 Paco Fortes

Footnotes

External links
Official website 

Football clubs in Portugal
Association football clubs established in 1932
1932 establishments in Portugal
Liga Portugal 2 clubs